This article lists equipment, weapons and vehicles formerly used by the New Zealand Army.

Infantry equipment

Uniforms

Camouflage patterns

Small arms

Rifles and Carbines

Pistols and revolvers 

  Webley Revolver

  Enfield No. 2
  Smith & Wesson Model 10

  M1911 pistol

  Browning Hi-Power

  SIG Sauer P226

Shotguns 

  Remington Model 870
  Browning Auto-5

Submachine guns

Machine guns

Artillery 

  Ordnance QF 4.5-inch howitzer

  Ordnance BL 6 inch 26cwt howitzer
  Ordnance, QF 3.7-inch mountain howitzer

  Ordnance QF 25-pounder
  Ordnance QF 6-pounder
  Ordnance BL 5.5-inch medium gun
  OTO Melara Mod 56

Vehicles

Tanks

Reconnaissance vehicles

Armoured vehicles

Utility and transport vehicles

See also 

 List of equipment of the New Zealand Army
 List of individual weapons of the New Zealand Defence Force

References

External links 

 New Zealand Arms Register

New Zealand Army
Military equipment of New Zealand
Equipment
New Zealand Army
Weapons of New Zealand